Argentina national team can refer to different sports:

Argentina national football team, male football
Argentina women's national football team, female football
Argentina national rugby union team (Los Pumas), male rugby union
Argentina men's national basketball team, male basketball
Argentina women's national basketball team, female basketball
Argentina men's national volleyball team, male volleyball
Argentina women's national volleyball team (Las Panteras), female volleyball
Argentina men's national field hockey team, male field hockey
Argentina women's national field hockey team (Las Leonas), female field hockey